The Osmangazi Tunnel, formerly Kocatepe Tunnel, is a road tunnel constructed on the Adapazarı–Bilecik state highway  in Bilecik Province, western Turkey.

It is situated between Vezirhan and Bilecik bypassing the Gülümbe Pass with hairpin turns. The -long twin-tube tunnel carries two lanes of traffic in each direction. The -long Ertuğrulgazi Tunnel is located north of it.

In 2000, a financial agreement was signed between the Turkish and Japanese governments to build a divided highway with two tunnels at the steep pass. Construction works on the highway began in 2003, and in 2010 the route was put into service. The tunnel was initially named Kocatepe Tunnel, but was renamed in 2009 in honor of Osman Gazi (1258–1326), who founded the Ottoman Empire in the region.

References

Road tunnels in Turkey
Transport in Bilecik Province